The 2016 AFF Women's Championship was the ninth edition of the AFF Women's Championship, an international women's football tournament organised by the ASEAN Football Federation (AFF). The tournament was held in Mandalay, Myanmar between 26 July–4 August 2016.

Thailand successfully defended their title after beating Vietnam in the final via penalty shoot-out.

Participating teams
8 teams were set to take part in the tournament in Mandalay, Myanmar. Indonesia was suspended by FIFA at the time the group was announced. Australia sent its under-20 team. Japan, Chinese Taipei and South Korea were invited to participate as the eighth team in the tournament. However none of the three confirmed their participation and Timor Leste was named as the tournament's eighth team.

 
  (Hosts)
 
 
 
  (Holders)

Squads

Group stage
The top two teams of each group advanced to the semi-finals.

Tiebreakers
The teams are ranked according to points (3 points for a win, 1 point for a draw, 0 points for a loss). If tied on points, tiebreakers are applied in the following order:
Goal difference in all the group matches;
Greater number of goals scored in all the group matches;
Result of the direct match between the teams concerned;
Kicks from the penalty mark if the teams concerned are still on the field of play.
Lowest score using Fair Play Criteria;
Drawing of lots.

All times listed are Myanmar Standard Time (UTC+06:30)

Group A

Group B

Knockout stage

Semi-finals

Third place match

Final

Awards

Controversy
In the 6th round of the penalty shoot-out of the final between Vietnam and Thailand, Thailand's Rattikan Thongsombut shot out while Vietnam's Nguyễn Thị Liễu effort hit goalkeeper Waraporn Boonsing and rolled its way past the goal line before being shot away by the goalkeeper. Myanmar referee Thein Thein Aye first recognised for a goal but reversed her decision after discussing with two lineswomen, Singapore's Mohd Nasir and Merlo Albano from the Philippines stated the ball had not entirely crossed the goal line. Vietnamese media calls the event as a "stolen championship".

Goalscorers
9 goals

 Win Theingi Tun

6 goals

 Nguyễn Thị Muôn

5 goals

 Shereilynn Elly Pius
 Nguyễn Thị Tuyết Dung

4 goals

 Nur Haniza Sa'arani
 May Thu Kyaw
 Anootsara Maijarern
 Nguyễn Thị Minh Nguyệt

3 goals

 Eliza Ammendolia
 Melina Ayres
 Melinda Barbieri
 Emily Condon
 Ally Green
 Yee Yee Oo

2 goals

 Olivia Ellis
 Grace Maher
 Cortnee Vine
 Malini Nordin
 Khin Marlar Tun
 Khin Moe Wai
 Wai Wai Aung
 Kanjana Sungngoen
 Pitsamai Sornsai
 Rattikan Thongsombut
 Huỳnh Như
 Nguyễn Thị Liễu

1 goal

 Alex Chidiac
 Ashleigh Lefevre
 Sophie Nenadovic
 Georgia Plessas
 Clare Wheeler
 Dadree Rofinus
 Hlayin Win
 Khin Mo Mo Tun
 Christina de los Reyes
 Camille Wilson
 Alisa Rukpinij
 Nisa Romyen
 Orathai Srimanee
 Taneekarn Dangda
 Thanatta Chawong
 Nguyễn Thị Hòa
 Nguyễn Thị Nguyệt
 Nguyễn Thị Xuyến
 Phạm Hải Yến

1 own goal

 Nur Izyani Noorghani (against Vietnam)
 Luisa Marques (against Malaysia)
 Natacha Sarmento (against Malaysia)

Final ranking

References

3
2016
2016 in Burmese football
2016
2016 in women's association football